Obříství is a municipality and village in Mělník District in the Central Bohemian Region of the Czech Republic. It has about 1,600 inhabitants.

Administrative parts
Villages of Dušníky and Semilkovice are administrative parts of Obříství.

Notable people
Bedřich Smetana (1824–1884), composer; lived and married here
Svatopluk Čech (1846–1908), writer and poet; lived here in 1895–1903

References

Villages in Mělník District